This list includes notable people who were born or have lived in Wheaton, Illinois.

Business
 Elbert Henry Gary (1846–1927), lawyer, county judge and founder of U.S. Steel
 Dan and Ada Rice (Daniel 1896–1975; Ada 1898–1977), businesspeople, Thoroughbred racehorse owners and breeders, and philanthropists; owners of Kentucky Derby winner Lucky Debonair

Media and entertainment 

 Shane Acker (born 1971), filmmaker and animator
 Jane Adams (born 1965), film, television, and theatre actress
 Selamawi Asgedom (born 1976), author of Of Beetles and Angels: A Boy's Remarkable Journey from a Refugee Camp to Harvard
 Bobbie Battista (born 1952), CNN anchor; attended high school in Wheaton
 Andrew Belle (born 1984), singer and songwriter
 Jim Belushi (born 1954), actor (According to Jim, K-9, Red Heat)
 John Belushi (1949–1982), actor (Saturday Night Live, The Blues Brothers, and Animal House)
 Wes Craven (1939–2015), horror film director (A Nightmare on Elm Street); alumnus of Wheaton College
 John Drury (1927–2007), Chicago television news anchor
 Dennis Dugan (born 1946), actor and director (Happy Gilmore and I Now Pronounce You Chuck and Larry)
 Tami Erin (born 1974), actress and model (The New Adventures of Pippi Longstocking)
 Danny Gonzalez (born 1994), YouTuber and former Viner
 A. Wilson Greene (born 1949), writer and historian
 Paul Hendrickson (born 1944), author, journalist and professor
 Clyde S. Kilby (1902–1986), author and professor at Wheaton College
 Ned Locke (1919–1992), Chicago TV and radio announcer
 Paul Maxey (1907–1963), actor who played character roles in films and television, starting in 1937
 Brian McCann (born 1965), actor, writer, and comedian
 Robert R. McCormick (1880–1955), publisher of the Chicago Tribune
 Joseph Medill (1823–1899), Mayor of Chicago; co-owner and managing editor of the Chicago Tribune
 Everett Mitchell (1898–1990), radio announcer
 Gail O'Grady (born 1963), actress (NYPD Blue, American Dreams)
 Lorraine Olivia (born 1968), November 1990 Playboy Playmate of the Month; graduated from Wheaton Central High School (1986) 
 Kate Pierson (born 1948), lead singer in B-52s, past spokesperson for People for the Ethical Treatment of Animals
 Janet Pilgrim (1934–2017), model and actress
 Rick Santelli (born 1953), on-air editor for the CNBC Business News cable network
 Sonal Shah (born 1980), actress (Scrubs)
 Sandra Smith (born 1980), reporter for Fox Business Network
 Bob Woodward (born 1943), author and reporter with The Washington Post; broke the Watergate scandal, co-writer of All the President's Men

Military 

 Mark S. Inch (born 1960), retired US Army Major General and ninth Director of the Federal Bureau of Prisons (2017–2018); graduate of Wheaton College; son of Morris Inch, Wheaton Professor
 Robert James Miller (1983–2008), US Army Special Forces staff sergeant; Medal of Honor recipient; graduate of Wheaton North High School
 James Howard Monroe (1944–1967), US Army PFC; Medal of Honor recipient; graduate of Wheaton Central High School; namesake of James Howard Monroe Middle School

Music 

 Andrew Belle (born 1984), musician
 Steve Camp (born 1955), Christian singer
 Blake Judd (born 1982), musician; lead vocalist of Nachtmystium
 Christopher Stringini, member of the European pop group US5

Politics and law 

 Ralph H. Barger (1923–2002), Illinois state legislator and mayor of Wheaton
 Joe Birkett (born 1955), Illinois Appellate Court justice; former DuPage County State's Attorney
 George Peter Foster (1858–1928), U.S. congressman from Illinois, 3rd and 4th districts
 Amy Grant, member of the Illinois House of Representatives (2019–present)
 William L. Guild (1910–1993), Illinois Attorney General and jurist
 Randy Hultgren (born 1966), U.S. congressman, represented Illinois's 14th congressional district from 2011 to 2019.
 Jeanne Ives (born 1964), Illinois state legislator (2013-2018), and candidate for Governor of Illinois (2018).
 Robert Jauch (born 1945), Wisconsin state legislator
 John McCandish King (1927–2016), member of the Illinois House of Representatives; between 1951–2015, he held the record as the youngest person to serve in the Illinois General Assembly 
 Prentice Marshall (1926–2004), U.S. District Judge for the Northern District of Illinois (1973–1996)
 Lewis V. Morgan (1929–2018), American judge, lawyer, and politician
 Evelyn Sanguinetti (born 1970), Lieutenant Governor of Illinois
 Samuel K. Skinner (born 1938), U.S. Secretary of Transportation and White House Chief of Staff under President George H. W. Bush

Religion 

 Jonathan Blanchard (1811–1892), pastor, educator, social reformer, and abolitionist; founder of Wheaton College 
 Jim Elliot (1927–1956), evangelical Christian missionary to Ecuador who was killed while evangelizing to the Waodani people; alumnus of Wheaton College
 Billy Graham (1918–2018), Christian evangelist; alumnus of Wheaton College
 R. Kent Hughes (born 1942), author; pastor Emeritus of College Church
 Isobel Miller Kuhn (1901–1957), Canadian missionary to the Lisu people of Yunnan Province, China, and northern Thailand
 John R. Rice (1895–1980), Baptist evangelist and journalist
 Miles J. Stanford (1914–1999), Christian author 
 Kenneth N. Taylor (1917–2005), translator of The Living Bible and founder of Tyndale House Publishers
 Phil Vischer (born 1966), creator of the children's show VeggieTales

Science and design 

 Edwin Hubble (1889–1953), astronomer after whom the Hubble Space Telescope is named
 Jarvis Hunt (1863–1941), architect and designer of Chicago Golf Club's clubhouse in Wheaton
 Grote Reber (1911–2002), amateur astronomer, radio engineer and pioneer of radio astronomy

Sports

Baseball 

 Herb Adams (1928–2012), outfielder for Chicago White Sox
 Don Bollweg (1921–1996), first baseman for St. Louis Cardinals, New York Yankees, and Philadelphia/Kansas City Athletics
 Mike Joyce (born 1941), pitcher for Chicago White Sox
 Chet Lemon (born 1955), outfielder for Chicago White Sox and Detroit Tigers; World Series champion (1984)
 J. C. Martin (born 1936), catcher for New York Mets, and Chicago Cubs; World Series champion (1969)
 Dave Otto (born 1964), pitcher for Chicago Cubs, Oakland Athletics, Cleveland Indians, Pittsburgh Pirates, and Chicago White Sox; sports broadcaster
 Milt Pappas (1939–2016), pitcher for Baltimore Orioles, Cincinnati Reds, Atlanta Braves, and Chicago Cubs
 Jimmy Piersall (1929–2017), outfielder for Boston Red Sox, broadcaster for Chicago White Sox, lived and died in Wheaton
 Lee Pfund (1919–2016), pitcher for Brooklyn Dodgers
 Sy Sutcliffe (1862–1893), catcher for Baltimore Orioles and Washington Statesmen
 Ollie Voigt (1899–1970), pitcher for St Louis Browns

Basketball 

 Katie Meier (born 1967), head coach of University of Miami women's basketball team
 Randy Pfund (born 1951), former head coach of NBA's Los Angeles Lakers and General Manager of Miami Heat

Boxing 

 Mike Lee (born 1987), light heavyweight boxer

Football 

 Jon Beutjer (born 1980), former professional football quarterback in the Arena Football League and Canadian Football League
 Corey Davis (born 1995), NFL wide receiver for the New York Jets
 Titus Davis (1993–2020), former American professional football player who was a wide receiver
 Scott Dierking (born 1955), former NFL running back
 Rick Fox, football head coach, Drake University
 Kent Graham (born 1968), quarterback for eight NFL teams; 1986 National High School Quarterback of the Year at Wheaton North
 Garland Grange (1906–1981), former Chicago Bears player and younger brother of Red Grange
 Harold "Red" Grange (1903–1991), running back for the Chicago Bears and New York Yankees (NFL); known as "the Wheaton Ice Man"
 A. J. Harris (born 1984), former Canadian football running back
 Pete Ittersagen (born 1985), former NFL and CFL cornerback
 Rick Johnson (born 1961), former CFL quarterback, actor and director 
 Jim Juriga (born 1964), former guard for the Denver Broncos
 Tim Lester (born 1977), head football coach at Western Michigan University, from 2017 - 2022
 Chuck Long (born 1963), College Football Hall of Fame quarterback; offensive coordinator of University of Kansas football
 Tony Moeaki (born 1987), tight end for the Kansas City Chiefs and Buffalo Bills
 Todd Monken (born 1966), offensive coordinator and quarterback coach for University of Georgia
 Matt Rahn (born 1982), retired American football player and since 2020, the acting head coach of the College of DuPage Chaparrals football team
 Steve Thonn, American football coach
 Clayton Thorson (born 1995), American football quarterback who is a free agent
 Danny Vitale (born 1993), former American football fullback
 Bob Zeman (1937–2019), defensive back for the San Diego Chargers and Denver Broncos, later coach for several college and professional teams

Golf 

 Charles B. Macdonald (1855–1939), golfer; built the first 18-hole course in the US
 Kevin Streelman (born 1978), golfer on the PGA Tour

Hockey 

 Alain Chevrier (born 1961), goaltender for five NHL teams 
 Jacques Cloutier (born 1960), goaltender for the Buffalo Sabres, Chicago Blackhawks, and Quebec Nordiques
 Ryan Dzingel (born 1992), forward for the Ottawa Senators
 Bobby Hull (1939-2023), forward for the Chicago Blackhawks
 Darren Pang (born 1964), goaltender for the Chicago Blackhawks; commentator for the St. Louis Blues
 Wayne Presley (born 1965), right wing for five NHL teams 
 Denis Savard (born 1961), Hockey Hall of Fame centre and head coach for the Chicago Blackhawks, Montreal Canadiens, and Tampa Bay Lightning
 Trent Yawney (born 1965), defenceman for the Chicago Blackhawks, Calgary Flames, and St. Louis Blues

Olympics 

 Adam Harris (born 1987), Olympic sprinter
 Thomas Jaeschke (born 1993), bronze medalist of the 2016 Olympic Games for indoor volleyball
 Sean Rooney (born 1982), Olympic volleyball outside hitter; gold medalist
 Jim Spivey (born 1960), three-time Olympic 1500 meter and 5000 meter track and field athlete
 Nancy Swider-Peltz (born 1956), Olympic speedskater (1976, 1980, 1984, 1988); mother of Nancy Jr. 
 Nancy Swider-Peltz, Jr. (born 1987), Winter Olympian speed skater (2010)

Soccer
 Charlie Fajkus (born 1957), former professional soccer midfielder

Tennis 

 Tim Gullikson (1951–1996), tennis player; coach of no. 1 ranked Pete Sampras; lived in Wheaton

References

Wheaton
Wheaton